Gan Thiam Poh  (born 23 October 1963) is a Singaporean politician and businessman. A member of the governing People's Action Party (PAP), he has been the Member of Parliament (MP) representing the Fernvale division of Ang Mo Kio GRC since 2020, and previously the Sengkang South division of Ang Mo Kio GRC between 2015 and 2020, and the Punggol South division of Pasir Ris–Punggol GRC between 2011 and 2015.

Early life and education
Gan attended Mee Toh Primary School, Hwi Yoh Secondary School and Outram Secondary School before graduating from the National University of Singapore in 1988 with a Bachelor of Science degree in economics, mathematics and computer programming & applications.

He also obtained a diploma in accounting, costing and business statistics from the London Chamber of Commerce & Industry in 1983. He received a certificate in English and Chinese translation and interpretation from Temasek Polytechnic in 2003.

Career
Gan has worked at DBS Bank as its senior vice-president since 2002. Before that, he had worked at Maybank and United Overseas Bank. He was awarded the Public Service Medal in 2001.

Political career 
Gan spent 15 years volunteering in Potong Pasir SMC. He was the vice-chairman of both the Citizens' Consultative Committee and the Community Club Management Committee in Potong Pasir. He was also the Branch Secretary of PAP Potong Pasir Branch. Gan has been a Member of Parliament since winning the 2011 general election as a candidate of the governing People's Action Party (PAP).

Ahead of his election in 2011, Gan shared that the opposition's presence in Parliament would be good for Singapore's development but that the opposition had to "propose a programme to serve the people and not just oppose the PAP for the sake of it".

Personal life 
Gan is married and has two daughters. He is fluent in Hokkien, Teochew and Cantonese.

See also
 List of Singapore MPs
 List of current Singapore MPs

References

External links
 Gan Thiam Poh on Parliament of Singapore

1963 births
Living people
Singaporean Buddhists
People's Action Party politicians
National University of Singapore alumni
Singaporean people of Hokkien descent
Members of the Parliament of Singapore